Chapiro is a surname. Notable people with the surname include:

Jacques Chapiro (1887–1972), Jewish Russian-born, French painter.
Liliane Chapiro-Volpert (1902-1982), known as Lilian Constantini, French actress in the 1920s and 1930s.
Mikhail Chapiro (born 1938), Jewish Russian-born, Canadian painter.

See also
Shapiro

Jewish surnames